Peter Wai-Kwong Li (born 18 April 1952) is a mathematician whose research interests include differential geometry and partial differential equations, in particular geometric analysis. After undergraduate work at California State University, Fresno, he received his Ph.D. at University of California, Berkeley under Shiing-Shen Chern in 1979. Presently he is Professor Emeritus at University of California, Irvine, where he has been located since 1991.

His most notable work includes the discovery of the Li–Yau differential Harnack inequalities, and the proof of the Willmore conjecture in the case of non-embedded surfaces, both done in collaboration with Shing-Tung Yau. He is an expert on the subject of function theory on complete Riemannian manifolds.

He has been the recipient of a Guggenheim Fellowship in 1989 and a Sloan Research Fellowship. In 2002, he was an invited speaker in the Differential Geometry section of the International Congress of Mathematicians in Beijing, where he spoke on the subject of harmonic functions on Riemannian manifolds. In 2007, he was elected a member of the American Academy of Arts and Sciences, which cited his "pioneering" achievements in geometric analysis, and in particular his paper with Yau on the differential Harnack inequalities, and its application by Richard S. Hamilton and Grigori Perelman in the proof of the Poincaré conjecture and Geometrization conjecture.

Notable publications

See also
 Ricci flow#Li–Yau inequalities

References

External links
Peter Li's website at University of California, Irvine

Differential geometers
UC Berkeley College of Letters and Science alumni
University of California, Irvine faculty
Fellows of the American Academy of Arts and Sciences
California State University, Fresno alumni
1952 births
Living people
20th-century American mathematicians
21st-century American mathematicians